Dožić is a Serbian surname. In the Morača region of Montenegro there is a brotherhood called Dožić-Medenica (Дожић-Меденица). Notable people with the surname include:

Gavrilo Dožić, Patriarch of the Serbs, as Gavrilo V (s. 1938–1950)
Mihailo Dožić, Orthodox hierodeacon and archimandrite
Sekula Dožić
Milovan Dožić
Savo Dožić
Milo Dožić, President of the Parliament of Montenegro (1 December 1910 – 12 February 1911)
Darko Dožić

Serbian surnames
Montenegrin surnames